Leontion (fl. 300 BC) was a Greek Epicurean philosopher.

Biography
Leontion was a pupil of Epicurus and his philosophy. She was the companion of Metrodorus of Lampsacus. The information we have about her is scant. She was said to have been a hetaera – a courtesan or prostitute. 

Diogenes Laërtius has preserved a line from a letter that Epicurus evidently wrote to Leontion, in which Epicurus praises her for her well-written arguments against certain philosophical views (which aren't mentioned in Diogenes' quote). According to Pliny, she was painted by Aristides of Thebes in a work entitled "Leontion thinking of Epicurus."

According to Cicero, Leontion is said to have published arguments criticizing the famous philosopher Theophrastus:
Leontium, that mere courtesan, who had the effrontery to write a riposte to Theophrastus – mind you, she wrote elegantly in good Attic, but still, this was the licence which prevailed in the Garden of Epicurus. This anecdote was later adopted by Pliny, in the preface of his Naturalis historia.

Notes

4th-century BC births
3rd-century BC deaths
3rd-century BC women writers
3rd-century BC writers
3rd-century BC philosophers
Ancient Greek women philosophers
Greek female prostitutes
Hetairai
Epicurean philosophers
Hellenistic-era philosophers
3rd-century BC Greek women